Cyperus latifolius is a species of sedge that is native to parts of tropical and southern Africa.

See also 
 List of Cyperus species

References 

latifolius
Plants described in 1806
Flora of the Republic of the Congo
Flora of the Democratic Republic of the Congo
Flora of Angola
Flora of Benin
Flora of Botswana
Flora of Burundi
Flora of Cameroon
Flora of the Central African Republic
Flora of South Africa
Flora of Ethiopia
Flora of Kenya
Flora of Madagascar
Flora of Malawi
Flora of Mozambique
Flora of Mauritius
Flora of Rwanda
Flora of Tanzania
Flora of Sudan
Flora of Uganda
Flora of Zambia
Taxa named by Jean Louis Marie Poiret